The Finnish Federation of Trade Unions (SAK) was a national trade union centre in Finland.

The federation was established in 1930, after the Finnish Trade Union Federation (SAJ) was banned.  Its initial affiliates were unions which supported the Social Democratic Party of Finland, whereas the SAJ had been dominated by communists.  Over time, the communists became prominent in the SAK, and this led a group of unions to split away in 1960 and form a new Finnish Trade Union Federation (SAJ).  In 1969, the SAK merged with the new SAJ, to form the Central Organisation of Finnish Trade Unions.

Affiliates

Presidents
1930: Edvard Huttunen
1937: Eero A. Wuori
1945: Erkki Härmä
1946: Emil Huunonen
1949: Aku Sumu
1954: Eero Antikainen
1959: Reino Heinonen
1960: Vihtori Rantanen
1966: Niilo Hämäläinen

References

National trade union centers of Finland
1930 establishments in Finland
Trade unions established in 1930
1969 disestablishments in Finland
Trade unions disestablished in 1969